Las Palmas de Cocalán National Park is located in the Cordillera de la Costa, Cachapoal Province, in the Libertador General Bernardo O'Higgins Region of Chile.

Protected areas established in 1967
Protected areas of O'Higgins Region
National parks of Chile